Hypolamprus melilialis is a species of moth of the family Thyrididae first described by Charles Swinhoe in 1900. It is found in Australia.

References

Moths described in 1900
Thyrididae